PIX provides film professionals with secure access to production content on mobile devices, laptops, or TVs from offices, homes or while in transit and won an Oscar for their technology in 2019. In November 2019, PIX and CODEX announced that the two companies are to be brought under a single unified brand identity with the establishment of the X2X Media Group.

History 
Founder and CEO Eric Dachs created PIX System in 2003. Dachs thought of the idea for PIX while working as an assistant to sound designer Ren Klyce on the 2002 film Panic Room.  PIX System has been used in the production of more than 5,000 movies including A Star Is Born, Black Panther, First Man, Green Book, Roma, and Spider-Man: Into the Spider Verse.

In 2019, PIX won a Technical Achievement Award for its digital rights management (DRM) system at the Academy of Motion Picture Arts and Sciences (AMPAS) Scientific and Technical Awards presentation. In February, the founders of PIX System received the Technical Achievement Award (Academy Certificate) for the design and development of PIX System's novel security mechanism for distributing media. In April, PIX acquired London-based tech developer Codex. Codex's expertise is in camera recording solution and the media workflow to getting film content shot on film set to the post production process.

Criticism 
On the November 4, 2019 Howard Stern Show, Howard Stern criticized the PIX system for not being able to pause or fast forward.
On the July 28, 2020, Howard Stern Show, Howard Stern criticized the PIX system again, stating Jimmy Kimmel hated it "more than Trump".

See also 
Codex

References

External links 

 
Film and video technology